Zagheh (also Romanized as Zāgheh) is a village in Dizaj Rural District, in the Central District of Khoy County, West Azerbaijan Province, Iran. At the 2006 census, its population was 28, in 7 families.

References 

Populated places in Khoy County